Paul Benjamin Auster (born February 3, 1947) is an American writer and film director. His notable works include The New York Trilogy (1987), Moon Palace (1989), The Music of Chance (1990), The Book of Illusions (2002), The Brooklyn Follies (2005), Invisible (2009), Sunset Park (2010), Winter Journal (2012), and 4 3 2 1 (2017). His books have been translated into more than forty languages.

Early life
Paul Auster was born in Newark, New Jersey, to Jewish middle-class parents, of Austrian descent, Queenie (née Bogat) and Samuel Auster. He grew up in South Orange, New Jersey, and Newark, and graduated from Columbia High School in Maplewood.

Career
After graduating from Columbia University with B.A. and M.A. degrees in 1970, he moved to Paris, France, where he earned a living translating French literature. Since returning to the United States in 1974, he has published poems, essays, and novels, as well as translations of French writers such as Stéphane Mallarmé and Joseph Joubert.

Following his acclaimed debut work, a memoir titled The Invention of Solitude, Auster gained renown for a series of three loosely connected stories published collectively as The New York Trilogy. Although these books allude to the detective genre, they are not conventional detective stories organized around a mystery and a series of clues. Rather, he uses the detective form to address existential questions of identity, space, language, and literature creating his own distinctively postmodern (and critique of postmodernist) form in the process. According to Auster, "...the Trilogy grows directly out of The Invention of Solitude."

The search for identity and personal meaning has permeated Auster's later publications, many of which concentrate heavily on the role of coincidence and random events (The Music of Chance) or, increasingly, the relationships between people and their peers and environment (The Book of Illusions, Moon Palace). Auster's heroes often find themselves obliged to work as part of someone else's inscrutable and larger-than-life schemes. In 1995, Auster wrote and co-directed the films Smoke (which won him the Independent Spirit Award for Best First Screenplay) and Blue in the Face. Auster's more recent works, from Oracle Night (2003) to 4 3 2 1 (2017), have also met with critical acclaim.

He was on the PEN American Center Board of Trustees from 2004 to 2009, and Vice President during 2005 to 2007.

In 2012, Auster said in an interview that he would not visit Turkey, in protest of its treatment of journalists. The Turkish Prime Minister Recep Tayyip Erdoğan replied: "As if we need you! Who cares if you come or not?" Auster responded: "According to the latest numbers gathered by International PEN, there are nearly one hundred writers imprisoned in Turkey, not to speak of independent publishers such as Ragıp Zarakolu, whose case is being closely watched by PEN Centers around the world".

One of Auster's more recent book, A Life in Words, was published in October 2017 by Seven Stories Press. It brought together three years of conversations with the Danish scholar I.B. Siegumfeldt about each one of his works, both fiction and non-fiction. It has been considered a primary source for understanding Auster's approach to his works.

Auster is willing to give Iranian translators permission to write Persian versions of his works in exchange for a small fee; Iran does not recognize international copyright laws.

Themes
Much of the early scholarship about Auster's work saw links between it and the theories of such French writers as Jacques Lacan, Jacques Derrida, and others. Auster himself has denied these influences and has asserted in print that "I've read only one short essay by Lacan, the 'Purloined Letter,' in the Yale French Studies issue on poststructuralism—all the way back in 1966."  Other scholars have seen influences in Auster's work of the American transcendentalists of the nineteenth century, as exemplified by Henry David Thoreau and Ralph Waldo Emerson. The transcendentalists believed that the symbolic order of civilization has separated us from the natural order of the world, and that by moving into nature, as Thoreau did, as he described in Walden, it would be possible to return to this natural order.

Edgar Allan Poe, Samuel Beckett, and Nathaniel Hawthorne have also had a strong influence on Auster's writing. Auster has specifically referred to characters from Poe and Hawthorne in his novels, for example William Wilson in City of Glass or Hawthorne's Fanshawe in The Locked Room, both from The New York Trilogy.

Paul Auster's recurring themes include:
 coincidence
 frequent portrayal of an ascetic life
 a sense of imminent disaster
 an obsessive writer as central character or narrator
 loss of the ability to understand
 loss of language
 loss of money – having a lot, but losing it little by little without earning any more
 depiction of daily and ordinary life
 failure
 absent father
 writing and story telling, metafiction
 intertextuality
 American history
 American space

Reception
"Over the past twenty-five years," opined Michael Dirda in The New York Review of Books in 2008, "Paul Auster has established one of the most distinctive niches in contemporary literature." Dirda also has extolled his loaded virtues in The Washington Post:

Ever since City of Glass, the first volume of his New York Trilogy, Auster has perfected a limpid, confessional style, then used it to set disoriented heroes in a seemingly familiar world gradually suffused with mounting uneasiness, vague menace and possible hallucination. His plots – drawing on elements from suspense stories, existential récit, and autobiography – keep readers turning the pages, but sometimes end by leaving them uncertain about what they've just been through.

Writing about Auster's most recent novel, 4 3 2 1, Booklist critic Donna Seaman remarked:Auster has been turning readers' heads for three decades, bending the conventions of storytelling, blurring the line between fiction and autobiography, infusing novels with literary and cinematic allusions, and calling attention to the art of storytelling itself, not with cool, intellectual remove, but rather with wonder, gratitude, daring, and sly humor. ... Auster's fiction is rife with cosmic riddles and rich in emotional complexity.  He now presents his most capacious, demanding, eventful, suspenseful, erotic, structurally audacious, funny, and soulful novel to date. ... Auster is conducting a grand experiment, not only in storytelling, but also in the endless nature-versus-nurture debate, the perpetual dance between inheritance and free will, intention and chance, dreams and fate.  This elaborate investigation into the big what-if is also a mesmerizing dramatization of the multitude of clashing selves we each harbor within. ... A paean to youth, desire, books, creativity, and unpredictability, it is a four-faceted bildungsroman and an ars poetica, in which Auster elucidates his devotion to literature and art.  He writes, 'To combine the strange with the familiar: that was what Ferguson aspired to, to observe the world as closely as the most dedicated realist and yet to create a way of seeing the world through a different, slightly distorting lens.' Auster achieves this and much more in his virtuoso, magnanimous, and ravishing opus.

The English critic James Wood, however, offered Auster little praise, criticizing his "Clichés, borrowed language, bourgeois bêtises... intricately bound up with modern and postmodern literature"; he drew a distinction between Auster- "probably America's best-known postmodern novelist"- and "Beckett, Nabokov, Richard Yates, Thomas Bernhard, Muriel Spark, Don DeLillo, Martin Amis, and David Foster Wallace", who to Wood "have all employed and impaled cliché in their work", where Auster, who "clearly shares this engagement with mediation and borrowedness- hence, his cinematic plots and rather bogus dialogue", "does nothing with cliché except use it". Considering this "bewildering", Wood opines that "Auster is a peculiar kind of postmodernist", going on to question "is he a postmodernist at all?", observing that "Eighty per cent of a typical Auster novel proceeds in a manner indistinguishable from American realism; the remaining twenty per cent does a kind of postmodern surgery on the eighty per cent, often casting doubt on the veracity of the plot". Wood however noted that "One reads Auster's novels very fast, because they are lucidly written, because the grammar of the prose is the grammar of the most familiar realism (the kind that is, in fact, comfortingly artificial), and because the plots, full of sneaky turns and surprises and violent irruptions, have what the Times once called "all the suspense and pace of a bestselling thriller." There are no semantic obstacles, lexical difficulties, or syntactical challenges. The books fairly hum along." He stated that "The reason Auster is not a realist writer, of course, is that his larger narrative games are anti-realist or surrealist." Wood also bemoaned Auster's 'b-movie dialogue', 'absurdity', 'shallow skepticism', 'fake realism' and 'balsa-wood backstories'.

Personal life
Auster was married to the writer Lydia Davis. They had one son together, Daniel Auster, who was arrested on April 16, 2022, and charged with manslaughter and negligent homicide in the death of his 10-month old infant daughter, who consumed heroin and fentanyl he was using. On April 26, 2022, Daniel, who was found to be in possession of drug paraphernalia, died from an overdose. Daniel was also known for his association with the Club Kids and their ringleader Michael Alig, and was present during the killing of fellow Club Kid Andre Melendez.

Auster and his second wife, writer Siri Hustvedt (the daughter of professor and scholar Lloyd Hustvedt), were married in 1981, and they live in Brooklyn. Together they have one daughter, Sophie Auster.

He has said his politics are "far to the left of the Democratic Party" but that he votes Democratic because he doubts a socialist candidate could win. He has described right-wing Republicans as "jihadists" and the election of Donald Trump as "the most appalling thing I've seen in politics in my life."

In September 2009, he signed a petition in support of Roman Polanski, calling for his release after he was arrested in Switzerland in relation to his 1977 charge for drugging and raping a 13-year-old girl.

Awards
1989 Prix France Culture de Littérature Étrangère for The New York Trilogy
1990 Morton Dauwen Zabel Award from the American Academy of Arts and Letters
1991 PEN/Faulkner Award for Fiction finalist for The Music of Chance
1993 Prix Médicis Étranger for Leviathan
1996 Bodil Awards – Best American Film: Smoke
1996 Independent Spirit Award – Best First Screenplay: Smoke
1996 John William Corrington Award for Literary Excellence
2001 International Dublin Literary Award longlist for Timbuktu
2003 Fellow of the American Academy of Arts and Sciences
2004 International Dublin Literary Award shortlist for The Book of Illusions
2005 International Dublin Literary Award longlist for Oracle Night
2006 Prince of Asturias Award for Literature
2006 Elected to the American Academy of Arts and Letters for Literature
2007 Honorary doctor from the University of Liège
2007 International Dublin Literary Award longlist for The Brooklyn Follies
2007 Commandeur de l'Ordre des Arts et des Lettres
2008 International Dublin Literary Award longlist for Travels in the Scriptorium
2009 Premio Leteo (León, Spain).
2010 Médaille Grand Vermeil de la ville de Paris
2010 International Dublin Literary Award longlist for Man in the Dark
2011 International Dublin Literary Award longlist for Invisible
2012 International Dublin Literary Award longlist for Sunset Park
2012 NYC Literary Honors for fiction
2017 Booker Prize Shortlist for "4321"

Published works

Fiction 
Squeeze Play (1984) (Written under pseudonym Paul Benjamin)
The New York Trilogy (1987)
City of Glass (1985)
Ghosts (1986)
The Locked Room (1986)
In the Country of Last Things (1987)
Moon Palace (1989)
The Music of Chance (1990)
Leviathan (1992)
Mr. Vertigo (1994)
Timbuktu (1999)
The Book of Illusions (2002)
Oracle Night (2003)
The Brooklyn Follies (2005)
Travels in the Scriptorium (2006)
Man in the Dark (2008)
Invisible (2009)
Sunset Park (2010)
Day/Night (2013)
4 3 2 1 (2017)

Nonfiction
The Invention of Solitude (1982)
The Art of Hunger (1992)
The Red Notebook (1995) (The Red Notebook was originally printed in Granta (44)). (1993).
Hand to Mouth (1997)
Collected Prose (contains The Invention of Solitude, The Art of Hunger, The Red Notebook, and Hand to Mouth as well as various other previously uncollected pieces) (first edition, 2005; expanded second edition, 2010)
Winter Journal (2012)
Here and Now: Letters, 2008–2011 (2013) A collection of letters exchanged with J. M. Coetzee.
Report from the Interior (2013)
A Life in Words: In Conversation with I. B. Siegumfeldt (2017)
Talking to Strangers: Selected Essays, Prefaces, and Other Writings, 1967-2017 (2019)Groundwork: Autobiographical Writings, 1979–2012 (2020)Burning Boy: The Life and Work of Stephen Crane (2021)
 Bloodbath Nation, [with photographs by Spencer Ostrander], (2023)

PoetryUnearth (1974)Wall Writing (1976)Fragments from the Cold (1977)Facing the Music (1980)Disappearances: Selected Poems (1988)Ground Work: Selected Poems and Essays 1970-1979 (1990)Collected Poems (2007)

ScreenplaysSmoke (1995)Blue in the Face (1995)Lulu on the Bridge (1998)The Inner Life of Martin Frost (2007)

Edited collectionsThe Random House Book of Twentieth-Century French Poetry (1982)True Tales of American Life (First published under the title I Thought My Father Was God, and Other True Tales from NPR's National Story Project) (2001)

TranslationsFits and Starts: Selected Poems of Jacques Dupin, translated by Paul Auster, Living Hand Editions, 1974
"The Uninhabited: Selected Poems of André du Bouchet" (1976)Life/Situations, by Jean-Paul Sartre, 1977 (in collaboration with Lydia Davis)A Tomb for Anatole, by Stéphane Mallarmé (1983)Chronicle of the Guayaki Indians (1998) (translation of Pierre Clastres' ethnography Chronique des indiens Guayaki)Vicious Circles: Two fictions & "After the Fact", by Maurice Blanchot, 1999The Notebooks of Joseph Joubert (2005)

Miscellaneous
 Auggie Wren's Christmas Story (1990)The Story of My Typewriter with paintings by Sam Messer (2002)
"The Accidental Rebel" (April 23, 2008: article in New York Times)
"ALONE" (2015) Prose piece from 1969 published in six copies along with "Becoming the Other in Translation" (2014) by Siri Hustvedt. Published by Danish small press Ark Editions

Other media
 In 1993, a movie adaptation of The Music of Chance was released. Auster features in a cameo role at the end of the film.
 In 1994 City of Glass was adapted as a graphic novel by artist David Mazzucchelli and Paul Karasik. Auster's friend, noted cartoonist Art Spiegelman, produced the adaptation.
 From 1999 to 2001, Auster was part of NPR's "National Story Project", a monthly radio show in which, together With NPR correspondent Jacki Lyden, Auster read stories sent in by NPR listeners across America. Listeners were invited to send in stories of "anywhere from two paragraphs to two pages" that "must be true", from which Auster later selected entries, edited them and subsequently read them on the air. Auster read over 4,000 stories submitted to the show, with a few dozen eventually featured on the show and many more anthologized in two 2002 books edited by Auster.
 Jazz trumpeter and composer Michael Mantler's 2001 album Hide and Seek uses words by Auster from the play of the same name.
 Paul Auster narrated "Ground Zero" (2004), an audio guide created by the Kitchen Sisters (Davia Nelson and Nikki Silva) and Soundwalk and produced by NPR, which won the Dalton Pen Award for Multi-media/Audio, (2005), and was nominated for an Audie Award for best Original Work, (2005).
 Austrian composer Olga Neuwirth's composition  ... ce qui arrive ...  (2004) combines the recorded voice of Paul Auster with ensemble music and live electronics by Markus Noisternig and Thomas Musil (Institute of Electronic Music and Acoustics (IEM)). Paul Auster is heard reading from his books Hand to Mouth and The Red Notebook, either as straight recitation, integrated with other sounds as if in a radio play, or passed through an electronically realized string resonator so that the low tones interact with those of a string ensemble. A film by Dominique Gonzalez-Foerster runs throughout the work featuring the cabaret artist and actress Georgette Dee.
 In 2005 his daughter, Sophie, recorded an album of songs in both French and English, entitled Sophie Auster, with the band One Ring Zero. The lyrics of three of the songs (in English) are by Paul Auster; and he also provided for the accompanying booklet translations of several French poems which form the lyrics of other songs on the album.
 Paul Auster's voice may be heard on the 2005 album entitled We Must Be Losing It by The Farangs. The two tracks are entitled "Obituary in the Present Tense" and "Between the Lines".
 On the 2006 album As Smart as We Are by New York band One Ring Zero, Auster wrote the lyrics for the song "Natty Man Blues" based on Cincinnati poet Norman Finkelstein.
 In 2006 Paul Auster directed the film The Inner Life of Martin Frost, based on an original screenplay by him. It was shot in Lisbon and Azenhas do Mar and starred David Thewlis, Iréne Jacob, and Michael Imperioli as well as Auster's daughter Sophie. Auster provided the narration, albeit uncredited. The film premiered at the European Film Market, as part of the 2007 Berlinale in Berlin, Germany on February 10, 2007, and opened in New York City on September 7 of the same year.
 The lyrics of Fionn Regan's 2006 song Put A Penny in the Slot mention Auster and his novella Timbuktu.
 In the 2008 Russian film Плюс один (Plus One), the main character is in the process of translating one of Auster's books.
 In the 2008 novel To the End of the Land by David Grossman, the bedroom bookshelf of the central IDF soldier character Ofer is described as prominently displaying several Auster titles.
 In the 2009 documentary Act of God, Auster is interviewed on his experience of watching another boy struck and killed by lightning when he was 14.
 In the 2011 documentary on Charlotte Rampling The Look, Auster meditates on beauty with Charlotte Rampling on his moored tug boat on the Hudson river.
Pedro Almodovar's 2019 movie, "Pain and Glory" ("Dolor y Gloria"), is in many ways an homage to the works of Paul Auster.  While Salvador is in his heroin induced stupor, Alberto logs on to his computer.  As the camera pans across the desktop screen, we see an icon entitled "Paul Auster."  The narrative structure and arc of the film, with its many coincidences (Federico stumbling on to the performance of the play; the discovery, many years later, of Eduardo's painting), are a visual depiction of an Auster novel.

Notes

References

Further reading
 Paul Auster, Gérard de Cortanze: La solitude du labyrinthe. Paris: Actes Sud, 1997.
 Franchot Ballinger: "Ambigere: The Euro-American Picaro and the Native American Trickster". MELUS, 17 (1991–92), pp. 21–38.
 Dennis Barone: "Auster's Memory". The Review of Contemporary Fiction, 14:1 (Spring 1994), pp. 32–34
 Charles Baxter: "The Bureau of Missing Persons: Notes on Paul Auster's Fiction". The Review of Contemporary Fiction, 14:1 (Spring 1994), pp. 40–43.
 Harold Bloom (ed.): Paul Auster. Philadelphia: Chelsea House Publ.; 2004.
 Thorsten Carstensen: "Skepticism and Responsibility: Paul Auster's The Book of Illusions." in: Critique: Studies in Contemporary Fiction 58:4 (2017): 411–425.
 Martine Chard-Hutchinson "Paul Auster (1947– )". In: Joel Shatzky and Michael Taub (eds). Contemporary Jewish-American Novelists: A Bio-Critical Sourceboook. Westport: Greenwood Press, 1997, pp. 13–20.
 Alain Chareyre-Méjan, Guillaume Pigeard de Gurbert. "". In: Annick Duperray (ed.). . Aix-en-Provence: Actes Sud, 1995, pp. 176–184.
 Gérard de Cortanze, James Rudnick: Paul Auster's New York. Gerstenberg, New York; Hildesheim, 1998
 Gérard de Cortanze. Le New York de Paul Auster. Paris: Les Éditions du Chêne-Hachette Livre, 1996.
 Robert Creeley: "Austerities". The Review of Contemporary Fiction, 14:1 (Spring 1994), pp. 35–39.
 Scott Dimovitz: "Public Personae and the Private I: De-Compositional Ontology in Paul Auster's The New York Trilogy". MFS: Modern Fiction Studies. 52:3 (Fall 2006): 613–633.
 Scott Dimovitz: "Portraits in Absentia: Repetition, Compulsion, and the Postmodern Uncanny in Paul Auster's Leviathan". Studies in the Novel. 40:4 (Winter 2008): 447–464.
 William Drenttel (ed.): Paul Auster: A Comprehensive Bibliographic Checklist of Published Works 1968–1994. New York: Delos Press, 1994.
 Annick Duperray: Paul Auster: Les ambiguïtés de la négation. Paris: Belin. 2003.
  Christian Eilers: Paul Austers autobiographische Werke: Stationen einer Schriftstellerkarriere. Winter, Heidelberg 2019. (= American Studies – A Monograph Series; 301). 
Sven Gächter: Schreiben ist eine endlose Therapie: Der amerikanische Romancier Paul Auster über das allmähliche Entstehen von Geschichten. Weltwoche (December 31, 1992), p. 30.
 François Gavillon: Paul Auster, gravité et légèreté de l'écriture. Presses Universitaires de Rennes, 2000.
 Charles Grandjeat: "". In: Annick Duperray (ed.). . Aix-en-Provence: Actes Sud, 1995, pp. 153–163.
 Ulrich Greiner: Gelobtes Land. Amerikanische Schriftsteller über Amerika. Rowohlt, Reinbek bei Hamburg 1997
 Claude Grimal: "Paul Auster au cœur des labyrinthes". Europe: Revue Littéraire Mensuelle, 68:733 (1990), pp. 64–66.
 Allan Gurganus: "How Do You Introduce Paul Auster in Three Minutes?". The Review of Contemporary Fiction, 14:1 (Spring 1994), pp. 7–8.
 Anne M. Holzapfel: The New York trilogy. Whodunit? Tracking the structure of Paul Auster's anti-detective novels. Lang, Frankfurt am Main 1996. (= Studien zur Germanistik und Anglistik; 11) 
 Beate Hötger: Identität im filmischen Werk von Paul Auster. Lang, Frankfurt am Main u.a. 2002. (= Europäische Hochschulschriften; Reihe 30, 84) 
 Heiko Jakubzik: Paul Auster und die Klassiker der American Renaissance. Dissertation, Universität Heidelberg 1999 (online text)
 Bernd Herzogenrath: An Art of Desire. Reading Paul Auster. Amsterdam: Rodopi; 1999
 Bernd Herzogenrath: "Introduction". In: Bernd Herzogenrath. An Art of Desire: Reading Paul Auster. Amsterdam: Rodopi, 1999, pp. 1–11.
 Gerald Howard: Publishing Paul Auster. The Review of Contemporary Fiction, 14:1 (Spring 1994), pp. 92–95.
 Peter Kirkegaard: "Cities, Signs, Meanings in Walter Benjamin and Paul Auster: Or, Never Sure of Any of It", in Orbis Litterarum: International Review of Literary Studies 48 (1993): 161179.
 Barry Lewis: "The Strange Case of Paul Auster". The Review of Contemporary Fiction, 14:1 (Spring 1994), pp. 53–61.
 James Marcus: "Auster! Auster!". The Village Voice, 39 (August 30, 1994), pp. 55–56.
 Brian McHale Constructing Postmodernism. London and New York: Routledge, 1992.
 Patricia Merivale: "The Austerized Version". Contemporary Literature, 38:1 (Spring 1997), pp. 185–197.
 Christophe Metress: "". In: Annick Duperray (ed.). . Aix-en-Provence: Actes Sud, 1995, pp. 245–257.
 James Peacock: "Carrying the Burden of Representation: Paul Auster's The Book of Illusions". Journal of American Studies, 40:1 (April 2006), pp. 53–70.
 Werner Reinhart: Pikareske Romane der 80er Jahre. Ronald Reagan und die Renaissance des politischen Erzählens in den USA. (Acker, Auster, Boyle, Irving, Kennedy, Pynchon). Narr, Tübingen 2001
 William Riggan: Picaros, Madmen, Naïfs, and Clowns: The Unreliable First-Person Narrator. Norman: University of Oklahoma Press, 1981.
 Mark Rudman: "Paul Auster: Some Elective Affinities". The Review of Contemporary Fiction, 14:1 (Spring 1994), pp. 44–45.
 Michael Rutschky: "Die Erfindung der Einsamkeit: Der amerikanische Schriftsteller Paul Auster"'. Merkur, 45 (1991), pp. 1105–1113.
 Edward H. Schafer: "Ways of Looking at the Moon Palace". Asia Major. 1988; 1(1):1–13.
 Steffen Sielaff: Die postmoderne Odyssee. Raum und Subjekt in den Romanen von Paul Auster. Univ. Diss., Berlin 2004.
 Joseph C. Schöpp: Ausbruch aus der Mimesis: Der amerikanische Roman im Zeichen der Postmoderne. München: Fink, 1990.
 Motoyuki Shibata: "Being Paul Auster's Ghost". In: Dennis Barone (ed.). Beyond the Red Notebook: Essays on Paul Auster. Philadelphia: University of Pennsylvania Press, 1995, pp. 183–188.
 Ilana Shiloh: "Paul Auster and Postmodern Quest: On the Road to Nowhere." New York, Peter Lang 2000.
 Carsten Springer: Crises. The works of Paul Auster. Lang, Frankfurt am Main u.a. 2001. (= American culture; 1) 
 Carsten Springer: A Paul Auster Sourcebook. Frankfurt a. Main u. a., Peter Lang, 2001.
 Eduardo Urbina: La ficción que no cesa: Paul Auster y Cervantes. Vigo: Editorial Academia del Hispanismo, 2007.
 Eduardo Urbina: "La ficción que no cesa: Cervantes y Paul Auster". Cervantes en el ámbito anglosajón. Eds. Diego Martínez Torrón and Bernd Dietz. Madrid: SIAL Ediciones, 2005. 433–42.
 Eduardo Urbina: "Reflejos lunares, o la transformación paródica de la locura quijotesca en Moon Palace (1989) de Paul Auster". Siglos dorados; Homenaje an Augustin Redondo. Ed. Pierre Civil. Madrid: Castalia, 2004. 2: 1417–25.
 Eduardo Urbina: "Parodias cervantinas: el Quijote en tres novelas de Paul Auster (La ciudad de cristal, El palacio de la luna y El libro de las ilusiones)". Calamo currente': Homenaje a Juan Bautista de Avalle Arce. Ed. Miguel Zugasti. RILCE (Universidad de Navarra) 23.1 (2007): 245–56.
 Eduardo Urbina: "Reading Matters: Quixotic Fiction and Subversive Discourse in Paul Auster's The Book of Illusions". Critical Reflections: Essays on Golden Age Spanish Literature in Honor of James A. Parr. Eds. Barbara Simerka and Amy R. Williamsen. Lewisburg, PA: Bucknell University Press, 2006. 57–66.
 Various authors: Special edition on Paul Auster. Critique. 1998 Spring; 39(3).
 Aliki Varvogli: World That is the Book: Paul Auster's Fiction. Liverpool University Press, 2001. 
 Florian Felix Weyh: "Paul Auster". Kritisches Lexikon der fremdsprachigen Gegenwartsliteratur (26. Nachlieferung), pp. 1–10.
 Curtis White: "The Auster Instance: A Ficto-Biography". The Review of Contemporary Fiction, 14:1 (Spring 1994), pp. 26–29.
 Eric Wirth: "A Look Back from the Horizon". In: Dennis Barone (ed.). Beyond the Red Notebook: Essays on Paul Auster. Philadelphia: University of Pennsylvania Press, 1995, pp. 171–182.

External links

 
 'The Searcher', interview with The Guardian in May 1999
 
 'An Interview with Paul Auster', interview with 3:AM Magazine in November 2001
 'Dem old Bush blues', interview with The Times in April 2004
 'The Tyrannies and Epiphanies of Chance', interview in the Oxonian Review in June 2004
 'Paul Auster and Siri Hustvedt in conversation' at the Key West Literary Seminar in September 2007 (audio)
 George Dunford interviews Paul Auster, interview with Cordite Poetry Review in August 2008
 [https://web.archive.org/web/20080913022444/http://blogs.villagevoice.com/music/archives/2008/09/interview_paul.php 'Interview: Paul Auster on His Newest Novel, Man in the Dark'], interview with Village Voice in September 2008
 Interview with Auster, discussing Man in the Dark with George Miller in November 2008 (audio)
 'The mechanics of reality', discussion between Paul Auster and school students in January 2009 (includes audio)
 A career evaluation of Auster and his new memoir at Open Letters Monthly
 I want to tell you a story piece by Auster at The Guardian, November 6, 2006. The subtitle reads: "one of America's greatest living novelists, argues that fiction is 'magnificently useless', but the act of creation and the pleasure of reading are incomparable human joys that we should savour"
 Paul Auster: Bio, excerpts, interviews and articles in the archives of the Prague Writers' Festival
 [https://web.archive.org/web/20091129005851/http://cle.ens-lsh.fr/49289063/0/fiche___pagelibre/%26RH%3DCDL_ANG110402 'Dossier – The Brooklyn Follies'], a collection of essays on Paul Auster's The Brooklyn Follies (English and French), on La Clé des Langues''
 
 Paul Auster presents Winter journal in Barcelona and talks about Mexico, Turkey, Iran and Occupy Wall Street movement, very interesting, book channel Canal-L
 How I Became a Writer. An interview with Paul Auster, 2015 Video by Louisiana Channel
 Bookworm Interviews (Audio) with Michael Silverblatt: January 1993, October 1999, December 2002
 Sauli Niinistö & Paul Auster. An interview conducted in 2017 by the President of Finland. Yleisradio.
Finding aid to the National Story Project records at Columbia University. Rare Book & Manuscript Library.
 

1947 births
Living people
20th-century American poets
21st-century American poets
20th-century American novelists
20th-century American male writers
21st-century American novelists
Writers from Newark, New Jersey
People from South Orange, New Jersey
American crime fiction writers
American expatriates in France
American male novelists
American people of Polish-Jewish descent
American male screenwriters
Jewish American novelists
Jewish American poets
Fellows of the American Academy of Arts and Sciences
Independent Spirit Award winners
Members of the American Academy of Arts and Letters
Postmodern writers
Prix Médicis étranger winners
Columbia College (New York) alumni
Commandeurs of the Ordre des Arts et des Lettres
American male poets
20th-century American translators
21st-century American translators
American male essayists
20th-century American essayists
21st-century American essayists
PEN/Faulkner Award for Fiction winners
Columbia High School (New Jersey) alumni
21st-century American male writers
Novelists from New Jersey
Film directors from New Jersey
Screenwriters from New Jersey
Columbia Graduate School of Arts and Sciences alumni
21st-century American Jews